High Rock may refer to:

Places
Antarctica
High Rock (Antarctica), nunatak on David Island

Bahamas
High Rock, Bahamas, former district of the Bahamas

Canada
High Rock (Ontario), hill in Ontario, Canada

South Georgia and the South Sandwich Islands
High Rock (South Georgia), rock formation of South Georgia

United States
High Rock (Washington), mountain in Washington state
High Rock Lake, reservoir in North Carolina
High Rock Lake (Nevada) lake in Nevada

Other uses
High Rock, region of Tamriel in The Elder Scrolls
High Rock, summit of the Alleghany Mountains in Savage Mountain
High Rock Farm, plantation house in North Carolina

See also
High Rock Mountain (disambiguation)
High Rocks, a geological site in England